The following lists events that happened during 2014 in New Zealand.

Population
National
Estimated populations as at 30 June.
 New Zealand total – 4,509,900
 North Island – 3,450,800
 South Island – 1,058,500

Main urban areas
Following the 2013 census, Statistics New Zealand added Blenheim to the list of main urban areas, increasing the total number to 17. Estimated populations as at 30 June.

Auckland – 1,413,500
Blenheim – 30,200
Christchurch – 375,200
Dunedin – 116,200
Gisborne – 35,400
Hamilton – 218,800
Invercargill – 49,800
Kapiti – 41,000
Napier-Hastings – 128,800
Nelson – 64,100
New Plymouth – 55,600
Palmerston North – 82,400
Rotorua – 56,200
Tauranga – 127,700
Wellington – 393,600
Whanganui – 39,200
Whangārei – 54,400

Incumbents

Regal and vice-regal
Head of State – Elizabeth II
Governor-General – Jerry Mateparae

Government
2014 is the third and last full year of the 50th Parliament, which first sat on 20 December 2011. The general election following the dissolution of parliament was held on 20 September 2014.

The Fifth National Government, first elected in 2008, continues.

Speaker of the House – David Carter
Prime Minister – John Key
Deputy Prime Minister – Bill English
Leader of the House – Gerry Brownlee
Minister of Finance – Bill English
Minister of Foreign Affairs – Murray McCully

Other party leaders
Labour – David Cunliffe until 27 September, then from 18 November Andrew Little
Green  – Russel Norman and Metiria Turei
New Zealand First – Winston Peters
Māori Party  – Tariana Turia until 1 November then Marama Fox, and Te Ururoa Flavell

Judiciary
Chief Justice — Sian Elias

Main centre leaders
Mayor of Auckland – Len Brown
Mayor of Tauranga – Stuart Crosby
Mayor of Hamilton – Julie Hardaker
Mayor of Wellington – Celia Wade-Brown
Mayor of Christchurch – Lianne Dalziel
Mayor of Dunedin – Dave Cull

Arts and literature

Performing arts

Benny Award presented by the Variety Artists Club of New Zealand to Tina Cross.

Events

January
 20 January – A 6.2 magnitude earthquake occurs near Eketahuna in the Manawatu-Wanganui region, causing moderate damage in Masterton and Palmerston North.

February

March
 8 March – Waitawa Regional Park opens

April
 7–16 April – Prince William, Duke of Cambridge, Catherine, Duchess of Cambridge and Prince George of Cambridge visit New Zealand on an official tour. It is Catherine and George's first visit to New Zealand.

May

June

July
11–21 July – Severe flooding damages thousands of properties in the Northland and Auckland regions.

August
13 August – Nicky Hager's book Dirty Politics: How attack politics is poisoning New Zealand’s political environment is published.

September
1 September – A gunman shoots dead two people and injures a third at the Work and Income office in Ashburton. The town is locked down for seven hours while police search for and apprehend the suspected gunman.
20 September – the 2014 general election is held.

October
16 October – New Zealand is elected to the United Nations Security Council for two years (2015–16) on the first ballot

November
 18 November – Andrew Little replaces David Cunliffe as leader of the Labour Party in the 2014 leadership election.

December

Holidays and observances
 6 February – Waitangi Day
 25 April – Anzac Day
 2 June – Queen's Birthday Monday
 27 October – Labour Day

Sport

Basketball
New Zealand's men's basketball team finished 15th at the 2014 FIBA Basketball World Cup

Commonwealth Games

Olympic Games

 New Zealand sends a team of 15 competitors in five sports.

Paralympic Games

 New Zealand sends a team of three competitors in one sport.

Rowing
New Zealand Secondary School Championships (Maadi Cup)
 Maadi Cup (boys U18 coxed eight) – Hamilton Boys' High School
 Levin 75th Jubilee Cup (girls U18 coxed eight) – Waikato Diocesan School
 Star Trophy (overall points) – Hamilton Boys' High School

Rugby
Ranfurly Shield – Hawke's Bay defeat Counties Manukau 27–21 to become the new holders of the shield.

Shooting
Ballinger Belt – Diane Collings (Te Puke)

Births
 13 September – Vin De Dance, Thoroughbred racehorse
 26 September – Melody Belle, Thoroughbred racehorse
 12 November – Grunt, Thoroughbred racehorse

Deaths

January
 2 January – Terry Magaoa Chapman, Niuean public servant (born 1944)
 15 January – Joyce Fenton, fencer (born 1927)
 16 January – John G. Cleary, computer science academic, promoter of Transcendental Meditation (born 1950)
 20 January 
 Graeme Dallow, police officer (born 1930)
 John Mackey, Roman Catholic Bishop of Auckland (1974–83) (born 1918)
 29 January – George Griffiths, historian (born 1933)
 30 January
 John Branthwaite, Anglican priest (born 1927)
 Mr Tiz, Thoroughbred racehorse (foaled 1984)

February
 3 February – Alister Leat, judoka (born 1985)
 5 February – Gary Giles, cricketer (born 1940)
 11 February – Olga Jekyll, fencer (born 1918)
 19 February – Graeme Lowans, cricketer (born 1934)
 20 February
 Ian McKay, Judge of the Court of Appeal (1991–97) (born 1929)
 Anthony Whitaker, herpetologist (born 1944)
 22 February – Charlotte Dawson, television personality (born 1966)
 24 February – Alexis Hunter, artist (born 1948)
 25 February – David McKinney, author and journalist (born 1945)
 28 February – Donald Murdoch, cricketer (born 1923)

March
 5 March – Little Bridge, Thoroughbred racehorse (foaled 2006)
 10 March – John Pring, rugby union referee (born 1927)
 13 March – Vince McGlone, seaman and television personality (born 1916)
 16 March – Frank Oliver, rugby union player and coach, All Blacks captain (born 1948)
 19 March – Gordon Patrick, cyclist (born 1914)
 20 March – Bill Toomath, architect (born 1925)
 21 March – David Beaglehole, physicist (born 1938)
 23 March – David Henshaw, cartoonist (born 1939)
 24 March – Margaret di Menna, microbiologist (born 1923)
 31 March – David Hannay, film producer (born 1939)

April
 1 April – Merimeri Penfold, Māori language academic (born 1920)
 3 April – Dame Dorothy Winstone, educationalist and academic (born 1919)
 6 April – Charles Farthing, doctor specialising in the treatment of HIV/AIDS (born 1953)
 8 April – Ivan Mercep, architect (born 1930)
 15 April
 Jim Sprott, analytical chemist, forensic scientist (born 1924)
 Sir Owen Woodhouse, naval officer, jurist, President of the Court of Appeal (1981–86) (born 1916)
 21 April – Maria Olsen, painter and sculptor (born 1947)
 26 April 
 David Brokenshire, architect, potter (born 1925)
 Patrick Hanan, Sinology academic (born 1927)

May
 8 May – Allan Potts, athlete, athletics coach and administrator (born 1934)
 10 May – Lane Penn, rugby union player, coach and administrator (born 1938)
 11 May – Yvonne Cartier, ballet dancer and instructor, mime (born 1928)
 14 May
 Morvin Simon, composer, kapa haka leader, academic, historian (born 1944)
 Warren Sinclair, radiation physicist (born 1924)
 20 May – Ross Brown, rugby union player (born 1934)
 21 May
 Duncan Cole, association football player (born 1958)
 Mack Herewini, rugby union player (born 1939)
 22 May – Pani Stirling, educationalist (born 1937)
 23 May – Sam Harvey, cartoonist (born 1922)
 28 May – Ethel Divers, netball player (born 1915)
 30 May – Peter Hall, cricketer (born 1927)

June
 9 June – William Bradfield, amateur astronomer (born 1927)
 12 June – Pat Rosier, writer, editor, feminist activist (born 1942)
 18 June – Ces Renwick, cricketer (born 1924)
 21 June – John Heslop, surgeon, cricket administrator (born 1925)
 30 June – Rik Tau, Ngāi Tahu kaumātua (born 1941)

July
 2 July – Dave Feickert, mining safety expert (born 1946)
 3 July
 Peter Dawkins, musician and record producer (born 1946)
 Ramai Hayward, actor and filmmaker (born 1916)
 5 July – Gugi Waaka, entertainer (born 1937)
 10 July – Douglas Goodfellow, businessman and philanthropist (born 1917)
 13 July
 Con Devitt, trade union leader (born 1928)
 Josh Liava'a, rugby league player (born 1948)
 17 July – Ross Burden, model and celebrity chef (born 1968)
 20 July – Lynda Patterson, Anglican priest (born 1974)
 21 July – Kevin Skinner, rugby union player (born 1927)
 22 July – Glenn Jowitt, photographer (born 1955)
 25 July – Kenneth Ferries, cricketer (born 1936)
 27 July
 Eric Anderson, rugby union player and coach (born 1931)
 Sir Richard Bolt, air force officer (born 1923)
 Warren Dibble, poet and playwright (born 1931)
 29 July – Ron Johnston, speedway rider (born 1930)

August
 5 August
 Dave Hereora, politician and trade unionist (born 1956)
 Joe McManemin, athletics coach, sports administrator, Freemason (born 1923)
 10 August – Graham Gedye, cricketer (born 1929)
 13 August – Jack Shallcrass, author, educator, humanist (born 1922)
 16 August – Kevin Barry, rugby union player (born 1936)
 19 August – Bob Glading, golfer (born 1920)
 20 August – Margaret Marks, cricketer (born 1918)
 22 August – Helen Mason, potter (born 1915)
 27 August – Frank Corner, diplomat and public servant (born 1920)

September
 3 September
 Dorothy Braxton, journalist (born 1927)
 Johnny Cooper, rock and roll musician (born 1929)
 Mark Otway, tennis player (born 1931) (death announced on this date)
 5 September – Eoin Young, motoring journalist (born 1939)
 8 September – Errol Clince, hunter, engineer (born 1953)
 14 September – 
 Peter Gutteridge, musician (born 1961)
 Charles Littlejohn, parliamentary official (born 1923)
 22 September – Ben Webb, artist (born 1976)
 29 September – John Ritchie, composer, music academic (born 1921)

October
 3 October – Ewen Gilmour, comedian (born 1963)
 6 October – Peg Griffin, supercentenarian, oldest person in New Zealand (born 1904)
 9 October – Connell Thode, naval officer, yachtsman (born 1911)
 10 October
 Ivan Armstrong, field hockey player and coach, tennis umpire, educator (born 1928)
 Jonathan Mane-Wheoki, art historian, academic and curator (born 1943)
 Ernie Wiggs, rugby league player and coach (born 1941)
 13 October – Yvette Bromley, stage actor and theatre director (born 1913)
 14 October – Bob Neilson, rugby league player (born 1923)
 18 October – Veandercross, Thoroughbred racehorse (foaled 1988)
 21 October – Tuna Scanlan, boxer (born 1934)
 26 October – Sir Tay Wilson, sports administrator (born 1925)
 27 October – Ian Monro, naval officer (born 1927)

November
 2 November – Robert Tripe, actor (born 1973)
 5 November – Don McLaren, animal healthcare businessman, Thoroughbred racehorse breeder, horse racing administrator (born 1933)
 6 November – Len Jordan, rugby league player (born 1920)
 7 November – Rough Habit, Thoroughbred racehorse (foaled 1986)
 9 November – Jeanne Macaskill, painter (born 1931)
 14 November – Dave Dephoff, athlete (born 1928)
 15 November – John Sparnon, rugby league player (born 1943)
 16 November – Binney Lock, journalist and newspaper editor (born 1932)
 17 November – Warren Murdock, cricketer (born 1944)
 20 November
 Allan Baker, ornithologist (born 1943)
 Murray Gittos, fencer (born 1920)
 24 November – Peter Henderson, rugby union and rugby league player, athlete (born 1926)
 30 November – Norm Holland, jockey (born 1924)

December
 1 December – Rocky Wood, writer (born 1959)
 3 December – Pat O'Connor, Roman Catholic priest, Ecclesiastical Superior of Tokelau (1992–2011) (born 1932)
 12 December
 Graham Turbott, ornithologist and zoologist (born 1914)
 Alan Ward, historian (born 1935)
 13 December – John Hickman, meteorologist (born 1927)
 14 December – John McCraw, soil scientist and local historian (born 1925)
 16 December – Jack Hazlett, rugby union player, tannery company founder (born 1938)
 17 December – Leonard Kent, cricketer (born 1924)
 18 December – John Beedell, canoeist (born 1933)
 23 December – Nigel Priestley, earthquake engineer (born 1943)
 25 December
 Dave Comer, photographer, film location scout (born 1956)
 Tom O'Donnell, medical doctor, researcher and academic (born 1926)
 26 December – Judith, Lady Hay, community leader, mayoress of Christchurch (1974–89) (born 1927)
 29 December – Sir Ivor Richardson, jurist (born 1930)

See also
List of years in New Zealand
Timeline of New Zealand history
History of New Zealand
Military history of New Zealand
Timeline of the New Zealand environment
Timeline of New Zealand's links with Antarctica

References

 
New Zealand
2010s in New Zealand
New Zealand
Years of the 21st century in New Zealand